Glenea anterufipennis is a species of beetle in the family Cerambycidae. It was described by Stephan von Breuning in 1968. It is known from Vietnam and Laos.

References

anterufipennis
Beetles described in 1968